Dennis Township is a township in Cape May County, in the U.S. state of New Jersey. It is part of the South Jersey region of the state and of the Ocean City metropolitan statistical area. As of the 2020 United States census, the township's population was 6,285, a decrease of 182 (−2.8%) from the 2010 census count of 6,467, which in turn reflected a decline of 25 (−0.4%) from the 6,492 counted in the 2000 Census.

Dennis Township was incorporated as a township by an act of the New Jersey Legislature on March 1, 1827, from portions of Upper Township. Portions of the township were taken to form Sea Isle City borough (May 22, 1882) and Woodbine borough (March 3, 1903).

New Jersey Monthly magazine ranked Dennis Township as its 20th best place to live in its 2008 rankings of the "Best Places To Live" in New Jersey.

History
Dennis Township had been a dry town, where alcohol could not be sold, until 2001 when voters passed a referendum allowing liquor to be sold; the township council authorized the sale of a single license, which netted the township $1.1 million.

Geography
According to the United States Census Bureau, the township had a total area of 63.94 square miles (165.61 km2), including 60.42 square miles (156.49 km2) of land and 3.52 square miles (9.12 km2) of water (5.51%).

Belleplain (2010 Census population of 597) is an unincorporated community and census-designated place (CDP) located within the township.

Dennisville is the most important unincorporated community in Dennis Township. Ocean View is served as ZIP Code 08230. Other communities, localities and place names located partially or completely within the township include Clermont, East Creek, Eldora, Mount Pleasant, North Dennis, North-West Dennis, Ocean View, Savage Pond, South Dennis, South Seaville, Stipsons Island and West Creek Landing.

The township borders the municipalities of Avalon, Middle Township, Sea Isle City, Upper Township, Woodbine Borough in Cape May County; portions of Cumberland County, and the Delaware Bay.

Demographics

2010 census

The Census Bureau's 2006–2010 American Community Survey showed that (in 2010 inflation-adjusted dollars) median household income was $84,205 (with a margin of error of +/− $5,160) and the median family income was $84,400 (+/− $4,219). Males had a median income of $52,571 (+/− $3,535) versus $40,023 (+/− $5,496) for females. The per capita income for the borough was $30,545 (+/− $2,875). About 5.4% of families and 7.6% of the population were below the poverty line, including 12.0% of those under age 18 and 5.4% of those age 65 or over.

2000 census
As of the 2000 United States census there were 6,492 people, 2,159 households, and 1,737 families residing in the township. The racial makeup of the township was 97.43% White, 0.96% African American, 0.09% Native American, 0.43% Asian, 0.02% Pacific Islander, 0.62% from other races, and 0.46% from two or more races. Hispanic or Latino of any race were 1.51% of the population.

There were 2,159 households, out of which 41.7% had children under the age of 18 living with them, 65.9% were married couples living together, 9.8% had a female householder with no husband present, and 19.5% were non-families. 15.4% of all households were made up of individuals, and 5.7% had someone living alone who was 65 years of age or older.  The average household size was 2.91 and the average family size was 3.24.

In the township the population was spread out, with 28.3% under the age of 18, 6.4% from 18 to 24, 30.6% from 25 to 44, 22.5% from 45 to 64, and 12.3% who were 65 years of age or older.  The median age was 37 years. For every 100 females, there were 96.5 males.  For every 100 females age 18 and over, there were 93.4 males.

The median income for a household in the township was $56,595, and the median income for a family was $61,445. Males had a median income of $41,404 versus $31,329 for females. The per capita income for the township was $21,455.  About 4.0% of families and 5.5% of the population were below the poverty line, including 6.6% of those under age 18 and 4.2% of those age 65 or over.

Government

Local government 
Dennis Township is governed under the Township form of New Jersey municipal government, one of 141 municipalities (of the 564) statewide that use this form, the second-most commonly used form of government in the state. The Township Committee is comprised of five members, who are elected directly by the voters at-large in partisan elections to serve three-year terms of office on a staggered basis, with either one or two seats coming up for election each year as part of the November general election in a three-year cycle. At an annual reorganization meeting, the Township Committee selects one of its members to serve as Mayor and another as Deputy Mayor. The Committee members serve in a part-time capacity and receive an annual salary.

The governing body originally consisted of three elected officials, one of which would be elected by the membership to serve as the Mayor. In 1989 voters approved a ballot question to increase the membership from three members to five members, and in November 1990 the voters elected two additional Committee members. The first five-member committee took office in January 1991 at which time the governing body established the position of Township Administrator.

, the members of the Dennis Township Committee are Mayor Zeth Anthony Matalucci (R, term on committee and as mayor ends December 31, 2022), Deputy Mayor Scott J. Turner (R, term on committee ends 2023; term as deputy mayor ends 2022), Matthew J. Cox (R, 2022), Frank L. Germanio Jr. (R, 2024) and Thomas Van Artsdalen III (R, 2023).

In October 2017, the Township Committee appointed Nicolas Elisano to fill the seat expiring December 2019 that became vacant following the resignation of Melanie Smith, who was moving out of the township. In November 2018, Matthew J. Cox was elected to serve the balance of the term of office.

Federal, state and county representation 
Dennis Township is located in the 2nd Congressional District and is part of New Jersey's 1st state legislative district.

Politics
As of March 2011, there were a total of 4,499 registered voters in Dennis Township, of which 1,091 (24.2%) were registered as Democrats, 1,527 (33.9%) were registered as Republicans and 1,877 (41.7%) were registered as Unaffiliated. There were 4 voters registered as Libertarians or Greens.

In the 2012 presidential election, Republican Mitt Romney received 55.5% of the vote (1,809 cast), ahead of Democrat Barack Obama with 43.1% (1,406 votes), and other candidates with 1.4% (45 votes), among the 3,296 ballots cast by the township's 4,624 registered voters (36 ballots were spoiled), for a turnout of 71.3%. In the 2008 presidential election, Republican John McCain received 55.4% of the vote (1,904 cast), ahead of Democrat Barack Obama, who received 42.4% (1,459 votes), with 3,437 ballots cast among the township's 4,331 registered voters, for a turnout of 79.4%. In the 2004 presidential election, Republican George W. Bush received 58.1% of the vote (1,977 ballots cast), outpolling Democrat John Kerry, who received around 40.0% (1,362 votes), with 3,401 ballots cast among the township's 4,424 registered voters, for a turnout percentage of 76.9.

In the 2013 gubernatorial election, Republican Chris Christie received 69.1% of the vote (1,647 cast), ahead of Democrat Barbara Buono with 29.4% (702 votes), and other candidates with 1.5% (36 votes), among the 2,481 ballots cast by the township's 4,559 registered voters (96 ballots were spoiled), for a turnout of 54.4%. In the 2009 gubernatorial election, Republican Chris Christie received 51.9% of the vote (1,251 ballots cast), ahead of both Democrat Jon Corzine with 37.1% (894 votes) and Independent Chris Daggett with 8.2% (197 votes), with 2,411 ballots cast among the township's 4,572 registered voters, yielding a 52.7% turnout.

Education
The Dennis Township Public Schools serve students in pre-kindergarten through eighth grade. As of the 2020–21 school year, the district, comprised of two schools, had an enrollment of 615 students and 62.4 classroom teachers (on an FTE basis), for a student–teacher ratio of 9.9:1. Schools in the district (with 2020–21 enrollment from the National Center for Education Statistics) are 
Dennis Township Primary School with 268 students in grades Pre-K–2 and 
Dennis Township Elementary / Middle School with 336 students in grades 3–8.

Students in public school for ninth through twelfth grades attend Middle Township High School in Cape May Court House, together with students from Avalon, Stone Harbor and Woodbine, as part of a sending/receiving relationship with the Middle Township Public Schools. As of the 2020–21 school year, the high school had an enrollment of 741 students and 64.6 classroom teachers (on an FTE basis), for a student–teacher ratio of 11.5:1.

Students are also eligible to attend the Cape May County Technical High School in Cape May Court House, which serves students from the entire county in its comprehensive and vocational programs, which are offered without charge to students who are county residents.

The Roman Catholic Diocese of Camden operates Bishop McHugh Regional School, a Catholic K–8 school. It is supported by four parishes in Cape May County. The school has a Cape May Courthouse postal address. The Press of Atlantic City describes the school as being in Ocean View, though it lies outside of the Ocean View CDP.

Transportation

The Garden State Parkway is the most prominent highway serving Dennis Township, running for more than  through the township. Other significant roads serving the township include U.S. Route 9, New Jersey Route 47, New Jersey Route 83 and New Jersey Route 347.

Notable people

People who were born in, residents of, or otherwise closely associated with Dennis Township include:

 Richard S. Leaming (1828–1895), ship builder and politician who served in both the New Jersey General Assembly and the New Jersey Senate and on the Cape May County Board of Chosen Freeholders
 Jonathan Maslow (1948–2008), author who wrote extensively about nature, with a focus on obscure and little-understood animals
 Jarrett Porter (born 1993), baritone known for his performances as an opera and lieder singer.
 Willie Royster (1954–2015), catcher who played in four games for the Baltimore Orioles in 1981
 Joshua Swain (1778–1855), politician and inventor
 Jeff Van Drew (born 1953), U.S. Representative for New Jersey's 2nd congressional district and former member of the New Jersey Senate, representing the 1st legislative district

See also

Dennisville, New Jersey
Dennisville Historic District

References

External links

Dennis Township website
Dennis Township Public Schools

School Data for the Dennis Township Public Schools, National Center for Education Statistics
The Cape May County Gazette Local community newspaper
The Beachcomber

 
1827 establishments in New Jersey
Populated places established in 1827
Township form of New Jersey government
Townships in Cape May County, New Jersey